The 1995 Tippeligaen was the 51st completed season of top division football in Norway. Each team played 26 games with 3 points given for wins and 1 for draws. Number twelve, thirteen and fourteen are relegated. The winners of the two groups of the first division were promoted, as well as the winner of a play-off match between the two second placed teams in the two groups of the first division.

Teams and locations
''Note: Table lists in alphabetical order.

League table

Relegation and promotion 
 Moss, Strømsgodset and Skeid were promoted.
 Hødd, Ham-Kam, and Strindheim were relegated.
 Strømsgodset won the play-offs against Sogndal, 3–1 on aggregate.
 Match 1: Strømsgodset 3–1 Sogndal
 Match 2: Sogndal 0–0 Strømsgodset

Results

Season statistics

Top scorers

Attendances

References 

Eliteserien seasons
Norway
Norway
1